The Hertfordshire County Football Association, also simply known as Hertfordshire FA, is the governing body of football in the county of Hertfordshire, England. The Hertfordshire FA was founded accidentally in 1885 after the existing teams (then numbering around 20) agreed to hold a meeting to discuss their position, and ended up affiliating.

History
In the early 1880s there were already 20 clubs operating in Hertfordshire and with interest continuing to grow, the Secretary of St Albans FC, Mr R. Cook called a meeting in 1885 which was to have been held at The Football Association's Headquarters, then at 51 High Holborn in Central London but on arrival they found the offices closed.  An alternative venue was found for the meeting at the nearby The Farringdon Pub in Holborn.

In its first season 20 clubs affiliated and numbers substantially increased year on year.  Today the number stands close to 2,500 teams.

Key dates in the development of Hertfordshire County FA are detailed below:

1885 – Association formed with 20 member clubs

1894 – Under the guidance of Mr.H.W. English, a master at Hitchin Grammar School and Secretary of the Association from 1894–98 a scheme to control the Association's affairs by a council was introduced. The initial scheme, albeit developed and improved still forms the basis on which the administration of the Hertfordshire FA is conducted today.

1901 – Huge difficulties facing the association until a man of the moment, George Wagstaffe Simmons stepped in.  During Wagstaffe Simmons 18 years as Secretary the Association's fortunes were transformed.  When he took over there were less than 40 clubs with funds available under £20.  When he handed over to his successor the membership had grown, over 200 clubs affiliated and had assets of £500-£66- an enormous sum on money in those days, coming at the end of The Great War.

1924 – Wagstaffe Simmons appointed Chairman of the Hertfordshire FA Council and also represented the Hertfordshire FA on the Council of The Football Association, positions he held until 1951.  During his time with The FA he became Chairman of the International Selection Committee and established reputation, not only as an eloquent speaker on all subjects relating to the game, but as authority on its laws and admissions.

1935 – County Association reaches its Golden Anniversary with a Jubilee Banquet and Concert held at the Holborn Restaurant.  During the evening Mr. Wagstaffe Simmons was able to say 'I do not suggest that the Hertfordshire FA Council is perfect, but it's not far off'.  Proposing the toast to the Hertfordshire FA was Sir Stanley Rous, Secretary of The Football Association, who ten years prior to his appointment to football's top job was a member of the Hertfordshire FA Council.

1951–61 – During this period Hertfordshire's population increased by 34% which caused huge problems in relation to playing fields and recreational facilities.  The Association applied to The FA for financial aid, without which the necessary work could not be undertaken.

1960 – The Association celebrated its 75th Anniversary and at the Dinner Sir Stanley Rous, now a knight of the Realm, proposed the toast to Hertfordshire FA.  In 1985 Sir Stanley completed an amazing treble when he was guest of honour at the Association's Centenary Celebrations held at Watford Town Hall.

1961 – Sunday Football was brought under the control of the Hertfordshire FA and its rapid expansion introduced many new players to the game by hundreds.

1998 – Hertfordshire County Youth F.A. becomes part of the Hertfordshire FA.

1999 – Hertfordshire FA becomes a Limited Company, one of the first Counties in England to take this step. Managing Director Ron Kibble announces that the Association's nomadic existence was finally over when we bought the Lease of Letchworth Football Club Ground through the hard work of Mr Kibble, Eric Hand and Cecil Hudson.  New County FA Headquarters were opened in Letchworth.

Hertfordshire have many people who served their County year after year, some being Ernest Scott, W.R. Watson, George Wagstaffe Simmons, Percy Poulter and Arthur Aldridge.

Organisation
Hertfordshire County FA has a team of staff that look to safeguard and develop football within the county. Based at The County Ground in Letchworth, both the Governance and Development teams work together in improving the football experience for all within Hertfordshire.

The Governance Team – deals with Discipline, Competitions, Referees, Affiliations and all general enquiries regarding the administration side of grassroots football across the County.
The Development Team – deals with Charter Standard, Coach Education, Women & Girls, Disability, Small Sided football, Facilities, Funding and working with key partners to develop more opportunities to Get Involved in the game.

Affiliated leagues

Men's Saturday leagues
Hertfordshire Senior County League (1903)
Hertford and District League (1910)
Hertfordshire and Borders Churches League (2005)
West Herts Saturday League

Youth leagues
Mid Herts Rural Minors League (1968)
Royston Crow Youth League (1971)
Watford Friendly League (1970)
West Herts Youth League

Men's Sunday leagues
Barnet Sunday League (1966)
Berkhamsted Sunday League
East Herts Corinthian League (1993)
Hitchin Sunday League (1977)
North London and South Herts League (1985)
Olympian Sunday League – Watford (1972)
Review Sunday League
North West Essex Sunday League
Stevenage Sunday League
Waltham (Sunday) League
Watford Sunday League
Welwyn Hatfield Sunday League

Ladies and girls leagues
Bedfordshire and Hertfordshire County Girls and Women's League
Hertfordshire Girls Football Partnership League (2008)

Small-sided leagues
Mercury Ware & District 5-a-Side League (1969)
Stevenage Borough Football Academy (2003)
Stevenage Corporate 5-a-Side League (1999)
Ware Week 5-a-Side Senior
Ware Week 5-a-Side Youth
Welwyn 5-a-Side League (Football Mundial)
Wodson Fives

Affiliated member clubs
Current clubs that are affiliated to the Hertfordshire County FA are:

Baldock Town
Barnet
Bishop's Stortford
Boreham Wood
Berkhamsted
Berkhamsted Raiders
Bovingdon
Cheshunt
Codicote
Colney Heath
Hadley
Harpenden Town
Hatfield Town
Hemel Hempstead Town
Hertford Town
Hitchin Town
Hoddesdon Town
Kings Langley
Letchworth Garden City Eagles
Leverstock Green
London Colney
London Lions
Oxhey Jets
Potters Bar Town
Royston Town
Royston Town Youth Football Club
Sandridge Rovers
Sarratt
Sawbridgeworth Town
St Albans City
St Margaretsbury
Stevenage
Tring Athletic
Tring Corinthians 
Ware
Watford
Welwyn Garden City
Wormley Rovers

Leading Women's Clubs 
 Arsenal Ladies
 Colney Heath Ladies
 Royston Town Women
 Stevenage Ladies 
 Watford Ladies
 Wodson Park Ladies

County cup competitions
The Hertfordshire County FA run the following cup competitions:

Hertfordshire Senior Challenge Cup
Hertfordshire Senior Centenary Trophy
Hertfordshire Charity Cup
Hertfordshire Charity Shield
Hertfordshire Intermediate Cup
Hertfordshire Junior Cup
Hertfordshire Sunday Senior Cup
Hertfordshire Sunday Intermediate Cup
Hertfordshire Sunday Junior Cup
Hertfordshire Veterans' Cup
Hertfordshire Women's Cup
Hertfordshire Boys U9 Challenge Cup
Hertfordshire Boys U10 Challenge Cup
Hertfordshire Boys U11 Challenge Cup
Hertfordshire Boys U12 Challenge Cup
Hertfordshire Boys U13 Challenge Cup
Hertfordshire Boys U14 Challenge Cup
Hertfordshire Boys U15 Challenge Cup
Hertfordshire Boys U16 Challenge Cup
Hertfordshire Boys U18 Challenge Cup

Hertfordshire 7 v. 7 Girls U10
Hertfordshire 9 v. 9 Girls U14
Hertfordshire U10 Girls 7 v. 7 Challenge Cup
Hertfordshire U11 Girls 7 v. 7
Hertfordshire U12 Girls Challenge Cup
Hertfordshire Girls U12 Challenge Cup
Hertfordshire Girls U13 Challenge Cup
Hertfordshire Girls U14 '9 v. 9' Challenge Cup
Hertfordshire Girls U14 Challenge Cup
Hertfordshire Girls U15 Challenge Cup
Hertfordshire Girls U16 Challenge Cup

Source

List of recent Hertfordshire County Cup winners

Note: the 2019/20 Finals were not played due to Covid-19 and some of the cups were awarded jointly as follows:
 Herts Senior Cup - Hemel Hempstead Town and St Albans City 
 Herts Senior Trophy - Wormley Rovers and Oxhey Jets Reserves 
 Herts Charity Cup - Hemel Hempstead Town and Berkhamsted 
 Herts Women's Cup - Stevenage Women and Watford Ladies U23

Source

2018–19 County Cup winners

Source

Directors & officials

Board of Directors
E. W. J. King (President)
M. R. Bayliss (Chairman)
B. Curtis (Vice Chairman)
M. L. Miller (Finance Director)
P. Donovan (Competitions Secretary)
R. G. Dowden
S. R. Trulock
G. Phillips
A. J. Willmott
C. Spriggins

Key officials
Vicki Askew (Chief Executive)
Karl Lingham (County Development Manager)
George Wells (Operations Manager)
Lauren Halsey (Football Investigations Manager)
Danielle Quelch (Coach and Referee Education Officer)
Marianna Okoh (Finance Officer)
Callum Riley (Marketing and Communications Officer)
Lin Ennis (Football Administration Officer)
Joseph Karram (Operations Administrator)
Ken Headington (Adult Football Development Officer)
Beth Dawes (Youth Football Development Officer)
Richard Drake (Raising Standards Officer)
Phil Sharp (Referee Development Officer)
Adam Jones (Leagues Officer)

External links
 Hertfordshire County FA Official Website

References

County football associations
Football in Hertfordshire
Sports organizations established in 1885